Meftah Al Hamsal (born February 28, 1994), is a Saudi Arabian professional footballer who plays for Najran as a midfielder.

References

External links 
 

Living people
1994 births
Saudi Arabian footballers
Najran SC players
Al-Mujazzal Club players
Al-Nahda Club (Saudi Arabia) players
Al-Sahel SC (Saudi Arabia) players
Tuwaiq Club players
Saudi First Division League players
Saudi Professional League players
Saudi Second Division players
Association football midfielders